Locke, sometimes spelled Lock or Lok, is a common Western surname of Germanic origin. It is also a Scottish surname and a romanization of the Chinese surname Luo.

Origin
Locke has multiple origins and meanings, including:
from Old English, as an occupational surname for locksmiths or lock keepers;
from Old English, Dutch, German, and English, as a toponym for one who had residence near an enclosure, particularly one that could be locked; a barrier, particularly that on a river; or a bridge;
from Old English and Old High German, as a name for one with curly hair.
from a romanization of "Lok", the Cantonese pronunciation of the Chinese surname Luo /.

Locke is also the surname of a Scottish clan, with historic roots and a family seat in Peeblesshire. Variations on this surname include Loch, Lock, Lochlair, and Locklair, among others.

People with this surname
Alain LeRoy Locke (1885–1954), African American educator, writer, and philosopher
David Locke (disambiguation), multiple people
Dean Jewett Locke (1823–1887), physician, founder of Lockeford, California
Edwin A. Locke (born 1938), American psychologist known for the goal-setting theory developed with G. Latham
Gary Locke (disambiguation), multiple people
Geneva Locke (born 1988), Canadian actress
George Locke (1870–1937), Canadian librarian
Harvey Locke (born 1959), Canadian conservationist
Jeff Locke (disambiguation), multiple people
Joe Locke (actor) (born 2003), a Manx actor
Joe Locke (musician) (born 1959), an American jazz vibraphonist and composer
John Locke (disambiguation), multiple people
Josef Locke (1917–1999), an Irish tenor
Joseph Locke (1805–1860), English civil engineer, particularly associated with railway projects
 Joseph Locke, penname of Ray Garton, an American author
Keith Locke (born 1944), New Zealand Member of Parliament for the Green Party of Aotearoa, New Zealand
Kevin Locke (disambiguation), multiple people
Kimberley Locke (born 1978), competitor in second season of American Idol
Les Locke (1934–c. 1996), Scottish footballer with Queens Park Rangers
Lewis Locke (1835–1920), American Civil War Medal of Honor recipient.
Matthew Locke (disambiguation), multiple people
Michael K. Locke (1952–2014), American politician
P. J. Locke (born 1997), American football player
Powhatan B. Locke (c. 1828–1868), Justice of the Territorial Supreme Court of Nevada
Richard Adams Locke (1800–1871), 19th-century journalist and creator of the Great Moon Hoax
Richard M. Locke (born 1959), American political scientist
Sondra Locke (1944–2018), American actress
Spencer Locke (born 1991), American actress
William Locke (disambiguation), multiple people

Fictional characters
Locke, a pseudonym of Peter Wiggin's in novels by Orson Scott Card
Locke, father of Knuckles the Echidna in the Sonic the Hedgehog comic books
Locke Cole, a character in the video game Final Fantasy VI (FF3 in North America)
Adam Locke, Nick "Havoc" Parker's commander in the video game Command & Conquer: Renegade
Chōjin Locke, the main character of the manga Locke the Superman
 Jameson Locke, a character in the video game Halo 5: Guardians, Fireteam Osiris leader, former ONI operative
John Locke (Lost), in the television series Lost
Vernon Locke, supporting character, contractor, and current heist co-ordinator of Payday 2.

See also
 Lock (surname)
 Locke (disambiguation)
 Lok (disambiguation), which includes a list of people with the surname

References

English-language surnames